The Portland State Office Building is a government building located at 800 Northeast Oregon Street in Portland, Oregon's Lloyd District, in the United States. It houses the Oregon Bureau of Labor and Industries.

See also
 Ideals (sculpture)

References

External links
 

Government buildings in Portland, Oregon
Lloyd District, Portland, Oregon
Northeast Portland, Oregon